
Gmina Mieszkowice is an urban-rural gmina (administrative district) in Gryfino County, West Pomeranian Voivodeship, in north-western Poland, on the German border.

The gmina contains part of the protected area called Cedynia Landscape Park.

Villages
Apart from the town of Mieszkowice, Gmina Mieszkowice contains the villages and settlements of Chrzęstno, Czelin, Goszków, Goszkówek, Gozdowice, Jamno, Kamionka, Kępa Troszyńska, Kiwity, Kłosów, Kurzycko, Mirogniew, Motary, Nowiny, Ostępy, Plany, Ranowo, Rogaczewo, Sitno, Stare Łysogórki, Stary Błeszyn, Starzyn, Troszyn, Wierzchlas, Wierzchlasek and Zielin.

Neighbouring gminas
Gmina Mieszkowice is bordered by the gminas of Boleszkowice, Cedynia, Chojna, Dębno, Moryń and Trzcińsko-Zdrój. It also borders Germany.

References
Polish official population figures 2006

Mieszkowice
Gryfino County